On 10 October 1861 Royal Yacht, reputed to be the fastest schooner on the Texas coast, was chartered by Comdr. W. W. Hunter, CSN, for naval patrol duty off Galveston. Five days later she was damaged by a violent squall which caused the loss of her bowsprit. She was armed by the 23d and went on station between Bolivar and East Points. About 0230, 8 November, Royal Yacht was surprised at anchor outside Bolivar Point Lighthouse and, "after a desperate encounter," set afire by Lts. J. E. Jouett and J. G. Mitchell, commanding the first and second launches from USS Santee, blockading the port. Capt. T. Chubb and others were captured, but eventually paroled. At 0330, the watch on CS Bayou City lowered their boats to investigate and extinguished the fire with a few buckets of water, minutes before the magazine would certainly have exploded. At 0900, Royal Yacht was towed alongside General Rusk to remove arms and ammunition; her upper hamper was ruined but hull intact. On 11 November she was returned to Captain Charles Chubb, father of her captain, also part owner.

On 10 May 1862, Col. J. J. Cook, Confederate States Artillery, asked Commander Hunter to "deliver to Capt. Thomas Chubb as many arms and equipment as will suffice him to fit out his schooner, the Royal Yacht, for harbor service." She is known to have served again with Bayou City off Galveston as late as the end of October. Some time during the next 5 months, she was fitted out as a blockade runner for, on 15 April 1863, the schooner was overhauled by a boat from U.S. Bark William G. Anderson and sent to be condemned by the Key West prize court, along with her 97 bales of best cotton. The bark had not been able to outsail Royal Yacht but her second cutter, after a hard 6--hour chase, placed the quarry within range of a one-pounder Butler rifle and induced Captain Chubb to surrender once more.

References

Ships of the Confederate States Navy